Aliki Fakate (born 4 September 1985) is a French rugby union lock. 

Born at Nouméa, New Caledonia, he plays for Montpellier, where he moved  from Pro D2 club Lyon OU. He debuted for Lyon on 27 October 2007 against Racing Metro.

Fakate also represented France A against Italy A in the Nations Cup on 12 June 2009.

External links
"it's rugby" Profile
ESPN Scrum Profile
IRB Profile

1985 births
Living people
Lyon OU players
People from Nouméa
Rugby union locks
French rugby union players
Rugby union players from Wallis and Futuna